Metcalf (rarely, Metcalfs) is an unincorporated village and former railway stop located in the town of Holliston in Middlesex County, Massachusetts, United States. The village does not have its own post office, and was formerly a stop for the Boston and Albany Railroad. Today it is characterized its historic pump house and several historic structures abutting the crossroads of Washington St. and Summer St.. Historically the village also had a schoolhouse and several small farms, but remains a residential community today with some light industry, and the local Fatima Shrine.

Geography
Metcalf does not have any borders defined by the United States Census Bureau, and throughout its history has lacked any defining boundaries aside from its central point at the intersection of Washington Street and Summer Street in Holliston, which is corroborated by the U.S. Geological Survey. From its appearance on several atlases the village appears to lie well within Underwood Street to the north and east, the Cedar Swamp at its west, and the Medway-Holliston border to its south.

Holliston on the north, east, and west
Medway on the south

Notes

See also
Braggville, Massachusetts
Holliston, Massachusetts
East Holliston Historic District
Thomas Hollis Historic District

Holliston, Massachusetts
Villages in Middlesex County, Massachusetts
Villages in Massachusetts